Zarean (also Romanized as Zāre‘ān and Zār‘ān and Zahrān) is a village in Valdian Rural District, Ivughli District, Khoy County, West Azerbaijan Province, Iran. At the 2006 census, its population was 804, in 200 families.

References 

Populated places in Khoy County